Anjelika Solovieva (also Anzhelika Solovyova, ; born March 19, 1980) is a Kyrgyz former swimmer, who specialized in freestyle and backstroke events. Solovieva competed in two swimming events at the 2000 Summer Olympics in Sydney. She achieved a FINA B-cut of 1:06.33 from the Kazakhstan Open Championships in Almaty. On the second day of the Games, Solovieva placed forty-fourth in the 100 m backstroke. Swimming in heat one, she faded down the stretch to pick up a fifth seed in 1:07.63, exactly 1.3 seconds below her entry standard and 1.15 behind leader Lizza Danila of the Philippines. Three days later, Solovieva, along with Yekaterina Tochenaya, Anna Korshikova, and Nataliya Korabelnikova, placed fourteenth in the 4×200 m freestyle relay (8:41.21).

References

External links
 

1980 births
Living people
Kyrgyzstani female backstroke swimmers
Olympic swimmers of Kyrgyzstan
Swimmers at the 2000 Summer Olympics
Kyrgyzstani female freestyle swimmers
Kyrgyzstani people of Russian descent